David Thompson (born 12 March 1945) is an English former professional footballer who played in the Football League, as a right winger.

References

External links
 

English footballers
Association football midfielders
Wolverhampton Wanderers F.C. players
Southampton F.C. players
Mansfield Town F.C. players
Chesterfield F.C. players
English Football League players
1945 births
Living people